What's Up? is a musical notable as the first Broadway stage collaboration by Lerner and Loewe, with book by Arthur Pierson and Alan Jay Lerner, lyrics by Lerner, and music by Frederick Loewe.

Production
After meeting, the team of Lerner and Loewe started writing musicals, resulting in The Life of the Party (1942) and their first Broadway production, What's Up?.

The musical opened on Broadway at the National Theatre on November 11, 1943, and closed on January 4, 1944, after 63 performances. Directed and choreographed by George Balanchine, with the book directed by Robert H. Gordon, the cast included Jimmy Savo, Johnny Morgan, Gloria Warren, and Pat Marshall.

According to theatre historian Ken Bloom "Despite the talents on hand, the show was not a hit."

Musical numbers

Act I
"Miss Langley's School for Girls" — Jayne and Girls
"From the Chimney to the Cellar" — Jayne and Girls
"You've Got a Hold on Me" — Margaret and Sgt. Willie Klink
"A Girl Is Like a Book" — Cpt. Robert Lindsay
"Joshua" — Margaret
"Three Girls in a Boat" — Margaret, Jayne and Susan
"How Fly Times" — Sgt. Willie Klink, Sgt. Dick Benham and Fliers
"My Last Love" — Jayne, Sgt. Willie Klink, Margaret, Sgt. Moroney and Sgt. Dick Benham

Act II
"You Wash and I'll Dry" — Margaret, Sgt. Willie Klink, Susan and Second Lt. Murray Bacchus
"You Wash and I'll Dry" (Reprise) — Virginia Miller
"The Ill-Tempered Clavichord" — Jayne and Susan
"You've Got a Hold on Me" (Reprise) — Virginia Miller, Sgt. Dick Benham, Fliers and Girls

Cast

Reception
The New York Times reviewer wrote: "No doubt it is only an habitual pessimist who can look at 'What's Up' and find it not altogether to his liking. All the elements of a Broadway musical show are there. The tunes are fairly catchy. Jimmy Savo -- who undoubtedly is among the great folk of the world -- is present."

Theater historian Gerald Bordman wrote that Balanchine gave Savo "one of the evenings most delightful moments with the forlorn little comedian pursuing an Amazonian ballerina...yet the best dancing of the evening came...in Don Weissmuller's show-stopping tap routines...the book revealed that Lerner had a lot to learn about writing librettos."

The musical was "a negligible wartime musical about aviators quarantined in a boarding school for girls with the expected results."

Theatre historian Stanley Green commented: "Even with Jimmy Savo in the cast and George Balanchine as director, it was not an auspicious debut."

References

External links
 Internet Broadway Database listing

1943 musicals
Broadway musicals
Musicals by Alan Jay Lerner
Musicals by Frederick Loewe